Sharif Khamayuni Mukhammad (born 21 March 1990) is an Afghan professional footballer who plays as a midfielder for Churchill Brothers in the I-League

Early life
He was born and raised in Makhachkala. He is of mixed Dagestan and Afghan descent. His younger brother, Amir Mohammad, is also a football player of FC Anzhi Makhachkala.

Club career

Anzhi Makhachkala
He made his Russian Premier League debut on 10 July 2010 for Anzhi Makhachkala in a game against Lokomotiv Moscow.

Spartak Nalchik
Mukhammad signed in July a 1-year contract with Spartak Nalchik. He was given shirt number 17. He eventually made his debut on 23 July for Spartak Nalchik against Sokol Saratov in the FNL. With Spartak, he appeared in 34 league matches, scoring 1 goal.

AFC Eskilstuna
He joined the Swedish club AFC Eskilstuna on 17 August 2017.

Karmiotissa
In January 2019, Sharif got recruited by Cypriot club Karmiotissa for the season 2018–19 season.

Maziya
In December 2019, Sharif signed for Maldives Champions Maziya S&RC for the Dhivehi Premier League and AFC Cup. He appeared in 10 league matches and Maziya secured the league title on 19 January 2020.

Gokulam Kerala
In November 2020, Sharif signed for Indian club Gokulam Kerala FC in the I-League. On 25 January 2021, Sharif scored from the spot kick in I-League against NEROCA FC and Gokulam won that game 4–1.
On 27 March 2021, Sharif won the I-League title with Gokulam Kerala after scoring from an important free kick against TRAU FC. After winning the title with 29 points in 15 games, they qualified for the 2022 AFC Cup group stages.

On 28 May 2021, Gokulam Kerala extended the contract with Sherif for another season, as the team is set to represent the country in 2022 AFC Cup. He also appeared in the 2021 Durand Cup and Gokulam reached to the quarter-finals.

He scored the first goal of 2021–22 season of I-League in their 1–0 win against Churchill Brothers on 26 December. After back to back wins in both the group and championship stages under his captaincy, the club clinched I-League title again in 2021–22 season, defeating Mohammedan Sporting 2–1 in the final game at the Salt Lake Stadium on 14 May, and became the first club in fifteen years to defend the title.

At the 2022 AFC Cup group-stage opener, Mukhammad and his side achieved a historic 4–2 win against Indian Super League side ATK Mohun Bagan. Later, they were defeated 1–0 by Maldivian side Maziya S&RC, and 1–2 by Bashundhara Kings of Bangladesh respectively, and knocked out of the tournament.

International career
Mukhammad made his debut for Afghanistan against Japan in a World Cup qualification match. He played the whole game but lost with 5–0. He scored his first goal for Afghanistan against Singapore on 23 March 2017. On 28 December 2018, he scored his second international goal against Turkmenistan in a 2–2 draw match.

Career statistics

Club

International

Statistics accurate as of match played 24 March 2017

International goals
Scores and results list Afghanistan's goal tally first.

Honours
Maziya S&RC
Dhivehi Premier League: 2019–20

Gokulam Kerala
I-League: 2020–21, 2021–22

References

External links

 Profile by Russian National Football League 

Sharif Mukhammad at the-aiff.com (archived)

1990 births
Living people
Afghan footballers
Afghanistan international footballers
Russian footballers
Association football midfielders
Russian Premier League players
I-League players
FC Anzhi Makhachkala players
Afghan people of Dagestani descent
Russian people of Dagestani descent
Russian people of Afghan descent
Footballers from Makhachkala
PFC Spartak Nalchik players
AFC Eskilstuna players
Allsvenskan players
Karmiotissa FC players
Maziya S&RC players
Gokulam Kerala FC players
Cypriot Second Division players
Russian expatriate footballers
Afghan expatriate footballers
Expatriate footballers in Sweden
Expatriate footballers in Cyprus
Afghan expatriate sportspeople in India